Burnbank Athletic Football Club is a Scottish football club based in the Burnbank area of Hamilton, South Lanarkshire.  It played primarily in Scottish Junior Football Association competitions from 1885 until it went out of business in 1962, and won the Scottish Junior Cup on five occasions. The club started up again in 2004.

History
Formed in 1885 as Burnbank Swifts, the club was one of the most successful sides in the early years of the Junior game. They provided four of the team which played England in the first Scotland Junior international fixture in May 1889, with forward Jock Espie scoring the side's first ever goal. Espie later enjoyed a career in England with Burnley and Manchester City while full-back Bob Foyers went on to play for Newcastle United and the Scotland senior side.

Having won the Scottish Junior Cup twice in succession in 1888–89 and 1889–90, the club turned to Senior football and entered the 1890–91 Scottish Cup. An 11–0 thrashing of United Abstainers Athletic was an auspicious debut and Burnbank eventually reached the fourth round before losing 1–0 to Royal Albert. Swifts briefly joined the Scottish Football Federation for a season in 1891 before leaving to concentrate on cups and friendly matches then flirted again with league football in 1895, joining the Scottish Football Alliance but again, only for one season.

The club returned to Junior football in 1898 and changed their name to Burnbank Athletic in 1900. This immediately preceded their third Scottish Junior Cup victory in 1900–01 and Athletic went on to win the trophy twice more in 1910–11 and 1944–45. The club went out of business in 1962.

Other former Burnbank players include Tommy Cairns, Bobby Shearer, Willie Telfer and Jimmy Watson who all went on to win full international caps for Scotland later in their careers.

Scottish Junior Cup finals record

Honours
Scottish Junior Cup winners: 1888–89, 1889–90, 1900–01, 1910–11, 1944–45
Runners-up: 1927–28, 1930–31
Scottish Junior League winners: 1917–18
Lanarkshire Junior League winners: 1896–97, 1900–01, 1901–02, 1902–03, 1903–04, 1911–12, 1915–16, 1928–29, 1940–41, 1946–47
Lanarkshire Junior League Cup winners: 1928–29, 1958–59

Former players

1. Players that have played/managed in the top two divisions of the Scottish Football League or any foreign equivalent to this level (i.e. fully professional league).
2. Players with full international caps.
3. Players that hold a club record or have captained the club.
 Joe Murray

References

Sources
 Scottish Football Historical Archive

Defunct football clubs in Scotland
Association football clubs established in 1885
Association football clubs disestablished in 1962
1885 establishments in Scotland
1962 disestablishments in Scotland
Football in South Lanarkshire
Hamilton, South Lanarkshire
Scottish Junior Football Association clubs